Radio Alfa is a French radio station broadcast from Paris, aimed at the Portuguese community. It broadcasts to Ile-de-France on 98.6 MHz. Its studios are based in Créteil.

See also 
 Les Indépendants
 Frequency modulation
 Radio

External links

Créteil
Radio stations in France
Radio in Paris
Radio stations established in 1987
1987 establishments in France